Chowchilla Airport  is a public airport located one mile (1.6 km) southeast of Chowchilla, serving Madera County, California, United States. It is mostly used for general aviation.

Facilities 

 Runway 12/30: 3,250 x 60 ft (991 x 18 m), surface: asphalt

References

External links 

Airports in Madera County, California
San Joaquin Valley